Haddal is a surname. Notable people with the surname include:

Per Haddal (born 1942), Norwegian film critic